The Scottish Professional Championship was a professional non-ranking snooker tournament which was open only for Scottish players. The final champion was John Higgins.

History
The Scottish Professional Championship was held in Edinburgh in December 1949. There were four entries. Willie Newman, the holder, beat Bob Martin 6–5 in the first semi-final on 7 December. Harry Stokes beat Eddie Brown 6–5 in the second semi-final on 8 December. In the 21-frame final, played on 9 and 10 December, Stokes led 8–2 after the first day and won 11–4 on the second afternoon.

The Championship was held at the Nile Rooms in Glasgow in February 1951. There were three entries. Harry Stokes beat Bob Martin 6–1 in the semi-final on 6 February. In the 21-frame final, played on 7 and 8 February, Brown led 7–3 after the first day and won 11–9 on the second evening.

The Championship was held in Edinburgh in February 1952. The holder, Eddie Brown, beat Bob Martin 6–1 in the first semi-final on 6 February. Harry Stokes, beat J. Mitchell 6–1 in the second semi-final on 7 February. In the 21-frame final, played on 8 and 9 February, Stokes led 6–4 after the first day and won 11–4 on the second afternoon.

Defending champion Harry Stokes beat Eddie Brown 11–8 in the 21-frame 1953 event held at the Union Club in Glasgow on 20 and 21 March. There were only two entries.

The tournament restarted in 1980. In 1981 six Scottish players turned professional, and the event was held as an eight-man knock-out tournament, with Ian Black defeating Matt Gibson 11–7 in the final. The 1982 event was sponsored by Tartan Bitter and Daily Record. The event had no sponsor in the next year and was not held in 1984.

In 1985 the World Professional Billiards and Snooker Association gave backing to national championships in form of £1,000 per player. However, after 1989 WPBSA withdrew their support and the event was discontinued. After a 22-year hiatus the event returned in 2011, but was not held in the next season.

Winners

References

 
Recurring sporting events established in 1980
Recurring events disestablished in 2011
1980 establishments in Scotland
2011 disestablishments in Scotland
Snooker non-ranking competitions
Snooker competitions in Scotland
Defunct snooker competitions
Defunct sports competitions in Scotland